The Cornwall Women's Football League, known during the 2022-23 season as the Earthbound Electrical Cornwall Women's Football League for sponsorship reasons, is a football league which sits at level 7 of the league structure of women's football in England. The winner of the division is eligible for promotion to Division One of the South West Regional Women's Football League and there is no relegation from this league - although there is relegation and promotion between the two divisions - as there are no leagues ranked below this one in the pyramid system. It is affiliated to the Cornwall County Football Association.

Teams
The teams competing in the league during the 2022-23 season are:

DIVISION ONE
Bodmin Town Women 
Helston Athletic Women 
Bude Town Ladies
Mousehole Women 
FXSU Ladies
Foxhole Ladies
RNAS Culdrose Ladies 
Saltash Borough Ladies

DIVISION ONE EAST 
Dropship Ladies
Wendron United Ladies
Ludgvan Ladies
Wadebridge Ladies 
Charlestown Ladies 
St Agnes Ladies
Redruth United Ladies
Penryn Ladies
Callington Town Ladies
Padstow United Ladies

Former champions

References

7
Football leagues in Cornwall